Frederick Ernest Weiss FRS FLS VMH (2 November 1865 – 7 January 1953) was an Anglo-German Botanist. He was awarded the Victoria Medal of Honour in 1947.

Education
Weiss was educated at the Owens College (later Victoria University of Manchester), and earned a doctorate in botany (DSc) from the University of London in July 1902.

Career
Weiss was Professor of Botany at the Victoria University of Manchester. In 1913, Weiss succeeded Sir Alfred Hopkinson as Vice-Chancellor, initially on a temporary basis until a suitable candidate was found. He continued as Professor of Botany during his tenure as Vice-Chancellor and in 1915 he was succeeded by Sir Henry Alexander Miers, mineralogist and former principal of the University of London (1908–1915).

References

1865 births
1953 deaths
Fellows of the Royal Society
Presidents of the Linnean Society of London
19th-century British botanists
German emigrants to the United Kingdom
Fellows of the Linnean Society of London
Vice-Chancellors of the Victoria University of Manchester
Manchester Literary and Philosophical Society
20th-century British botanists